Raja Mishra (died 2 November 2020) was an Odia film director, actor, screen writer, cinematographer and music director. He was a gold medalist in cinematography from Film and Television Institute of India, Pune. In 1986 he directed his first Odia film Jor Jar Mulak Tar and he directed a total of 12 Odia films. He also directed seven Assamese language films.

Film career
Mishra debuted in the Odia film industry as an actor through Ulka in 1981. Later he did the cinematography, wrote the screenplay, worked as an editor, and composed music for some Odia films.

Some successful movies like 'Chaka Akhi Sabu Dekhuchi', 'Asuchi Mo Kalia Suna', 'Pua Mora Kala Thakura', 'Hari Bhai Harena' and 'Jibana Mrutyu' are directed by Raju Mishra.

Filmography

Awards 
 Jayadev Award, 2012 
 Fitfat Biscope Award, 2012 
 Guru Kelucharan Mohapatra Award, 2020

Death 
Mishra died on 2 November 2020 due to cardiac arrest at the age of 72.

References

External links 

 

Odia film directors
People from Khordha district
2020 deaths